888 commonly refers to:

 888 (number), an integer
 888 BC, a year of the 9th century BC
 AD 888, a year of the Julian calendar

888 or triple eight may also refer to:

Telecommunication 
 888 is prefix/area code for toll-free telephone numbers in the North American Numbering Plan
 888 is the number used to dial up teletext, subtitles on some programmes shown on European television channels
 Qualcomm Snapdragon 888, a chip system for mobile devices

Gambling 
 888casino, an online casino
 888 Holdings, an online gambling company, trading as "888.com"
 888poker, an online poker room
 888sport, an online bookmaker

Art and entertainment 
 888chan, an image board
 888 (manga), by Noriko Kuwata
 Triple 8, a British boy band
 888, a song by Cavetown

Other uses 
 Ducati 888, a motorcycle
 Route 888 (Israel), a road in Israel
 Triple Eight Race Engineering, an Australian motor racing team, related to the British team
 Triple Eight Racing, an English motor racing team
 8/8/8 is a nickname for the 2008 South Ossetia War that broke out on August 8, 2008
 888 is a contraction of the labour movement's slogan for the Eight-hour day
 4-hole extension of the ISO 838 standard of filing holes punched in paper is sometimes called "888"

See also 
 8888 (disambiguation)